Center Township is one of eleven townships in Lake County, Indiana, United States. As of the 2010 census, its population was 31,756 and it contained 12,875 housing units.

Geography
The township includes the city of Crown Point as well as portions of the town of Cedar Lake.

Education
Center Township residents are eligible to obtain a free library card from the Crown Point Community Public Library in Crown Point or Winfield.

Center Township, along with Winfield Township, is served by the Crown Point Community School Corporation which includes Crown Point High School.

References

External links

Townships in Lake County, Indiana
Townships in Indiana